Camille Lund Rasmussen (born 15 June 2004) is a Danish artistic gymnast.  She represented Denmark at the inaugural junior World Championships.  She is the 2020 and 2021 Danish senior national champion and is a two-time Northern European champion.

Early life
Rasmussen was born in Copenhagen, Denmark.  She began training in gymnastics when she was five years old.

Gymnastics career

Junior

2016 
Rasmussen competed at her first national championships where she placed first in the espoir division.  She competed at the Gymnova Cup where she placed third in the all-around in the espoir division behind Lisa Vaelen and Miriam Hamenni.  She finished the year competing at the Turnkunst International where she placed first in the all-around.

2017 
Rasmussen competed at the Austrian Team Open and finished third behind Jasmin Mader and Barbora Mokošová.  She competed at the Nordic Junior Championships where she placed second in the all-around behind Enni Kettunen.  She finished first on balance beam, second on floor exercise behind Jessica Castles, third on vault behind Kettunen and Sani Mäkelä, and sixth on uneven bars.  Rasmussen ended the year competing at the Northern European Championships where she placed fifth in the all-around but won gold on floor exercise and silver on vault.

2018 
Rasmussen continued her dominance at the Danish Championships, winning her third gold in the all-around.  In June she competed at the Nordic Championships where she placed third in the all-around behind Mari Kanter and Tonya Paulsson but won gold on floor exercise.  Rasmussen competed at the European Championships and finished 33rd in the all-around.

2019
At the Nordic Championships Rasmussen placed first in the all-around ahead of Maisa Kuusikko.  She won the junior national title at the Danish Championships and was selected to compete at the inaugural Junior World Championships.  Rasmussen finished 36th in the all-around.  She next competed at the European Youth Olympic Festival where she qualified to the all-around final and was the third reserve for the balance beam final.  She finished 19th in the all-around.  Rasmussen ended her junior career competing at the Northern European Championships.  She placed third in the all-around behind Welsh gymnasts Emily Thomas and Poppy Stickler.  Rasmussen won gold on vault.

Senior

2020 
Rasmussen turned senior in 2020; however the mass majority of competitions were either canceled or postponed due to the global COVID-19 pandemic.  In November Rasmussen competed at the Danish Championships where she won her first senior all-around title.  Additionally she won gold on vault, uneven bars, and balance beam and placed second on floor exercise behind Victoria Gilberg.

2021
Rasmussen made her senior international debut at the 2021 European Championships where she placed 44th in the all-around during qualifications.  In June she competed at the Danish Championships where she defended her all-around title.  Additionally she defended her vault, uneven bars, and balance beam titles and placed third on floor exercise.  In October she competed at the 2021 World Championships.  During qualifications she finished 36th in the all-around; she did not qualify for any event finals.  However, by finishing 36th she became the highest placing Danish gymnast in World Championships history, surpassing Mette Hulgaard's 53rd place in 2013.

2022
Rasmussen competed at the Varna Challenge Cup where she won silver on vault behind Aline Friess.  She next competed at the Nordic Championships, winning silver in the all-around.  At the European Championships Rasmussen finished 20th in the all-around.  As a result she qualified to compete as an individual at the World Championships later in the year.  Additionally Rasmussen qualified for the vault final where she finished sixth.

Competitive history

References

External links
 

2004 births
Living people
Danish female artistic gymnasts
Sportspeople from Copenhagen